A nagar panchayat (town panchayat) or Notified Area Council (NAC) in India is a settlement in transition from rural to urban and therefore a form of an urban political unit comparable to a municipality. An urban centre with more than 12,000 and less than 40,000 inhabitants is classified as a nagar panchayat.

Such councils are formed under the panchayati raj administrative system. In census data, the abbreviation T.P. is used to indicate a "town panchayat". Tamil Nadu was the first state to introduce the panchayat town as an intermediate step between rural villages and urban local bodies (ULB). The structure and the functions of the nagar panchayat are decided by the state government.

Management
Each nagar panchayat has a committee consisting of a chairman with ward members. Membership consists of a minimum of ten elected ward members and three nominated members. The NAC members of the Nagar  are elected from the several wards of the nagar panchayat on the basis of adult franchise for a term of five years. One third of the seats are reserved for Scheduled Castes, Scheduled Tribes, backward classes and women. The Councillors or Ward Members are chosen by direct election from electoral wards in the nagar panchayat. The structure and the functions of the nagar panchayat are decided by the state government.

Each Indian state has its own management directorate for panchayat towns.
 Karnataka: 
 Kerala: Local Self Government Department
 Maharashtra
 Tamil Nadu: Directorate of Town Panchayats

See also
 Municipal governance in India
 List of municipal corporations in India

References

Hindi words and phrases
Local government in India
Urban planning in India